The Williams FW41 is a Formula One racing car designed by Paddy Lowe and Dirk de Beer for the Williams team, to compete in the 2018 FIA Formula One World Championship. The car made its competitive debut at the 2018 Australian Grand Prix, and was driven by Lance Stroll in his second season with the team; and Sergey Sirotkin, making his competitive debut in Formula One.

Williams had finished fifth in the Constructors Championship in both 2016 and 2017, but saw their performance decline severely in 2018. Although the car had good reliability, its pace was poor and the team ended up at the back of the field mostly fighting the Toro Rossos. Their first points came in Azerbaijan when Stroll finished 8th. The team would not score points again until Italy, when Stroll and Sirotkin finished 9th and 10th respectively. They finished 10th and last in the Constructors' Championship, their lowest ever position. However, the seven points they scored exceeded the five points scored in both 2011 and 2013.

Design and development
In signing Sergey Sirotkin, Williams formed an alliance with Russian racing outfit SMP Racing, which came with financial investment in the team. While discussing the investment, SMP Racing revealed that under the terms of the agreement their investment would specifically be spent on technical development of the FW41 instead of being used to cover the costs of day-to-day operations.

Testing and development work was carried out by Robert Kubica. The role was Kubica's first with a Formula One team since his 2011 rallying accident that almost resulted in the traumatic amputation of his arm.

The car had problems with its development mainly being cooling, packaging and the aerodynamics which resulted in its uncompetitiveness.

Competition history

2018 was the worst year for Williams since 2013. Although its reliability was good, the car was consistently slow. The car scored points on only two occasions: the first was Stroll finishing 8th in Azerbaijan, and the second was at Monza where the team achieved a double points finish with Stroll finishing 9th and Sirotkin finishing 10th.

Complete Formula One results
(key) (results in bold indicate pole position; results in italics indicate fastest lap)

 Driver failed to finish the race, but was classified as they had completed more than 90% of the race distance.

References

External links

Williams Formula One cars
2018 Formula One season cars